Jens von Bustenskjold is the title of a Norwegian comic strip, which appeared in Arbeidermagasinet (later renamed Magasinet For Alle) from 1934 to 1970. It's a humoristic comic about a nobleman. The series was created by Sigurd Lybeck, and illustrated by Anders Bjørgaard. It was adapted into the 1958 comedy film Bustenskjold.

References

Norwegian comic strips
1934 comics debuts
1970 comics endings
Humor comics
Bustenskjold, Jens von
Bustenskjold, Jens von
Bustenskjold, Jens von
Norwegian comics adapted into films